Red Wagon is a 1933 British drama film directed by Paul L. Stein and starring Charles Bickford, Anthony Bushell and Greta Nissen. The screenplay involves a circus owner who falls in love with a lion tamer.

It was made at Elstree Studios by British International Pictures and adapted from the 1930 novel Red Wagon by Lady Eleanor Smith. The film's sets were designed by the art director John Mead.

Cast

References

Bibliography
 Low, Rachael. Filmmaking in 1930s Britain. George Allen & Unwin, 1985.
 Wood, Linda. British Films, 1927-1939. British Film Institute, 1986.

External links
 

1933 films
Films shot at British International Pictures Studios
Films directed by Paul L. Stein
1933 drama films
British drama films
Films based on British novels
Films set in England
British black-and-white films
1930s English-language films
1930s British films